

Worst railway accidents

Other major railway accidents

Footnotes

References

External links
 

Canada
Railway accidents and incidents in Canada